West Sussex is a county in South East England on the English Channel coast. The ceremonial county comprises the districts of Adur, Arun, Chichester, Horsham, and Mid Sussex, and the boroughs of Crawley and Worthing. Covering an area of 1,991 square kilometres (769 sq mi), West Sussex borders Hampshire to the west, Surrey to the north, and East Sussex to the east. The county town and only city in West Sussex is Chichester, located in the south-west of the county. In the 2011 census, West Sussex recorded a population of 806,900.

The county has a long history of human settlement dating back to the Lower Paleolithic era. The Romans conquered West Sussex's indigenous Britons, and incorporated the area as a Roman province. During the Early Middle Ages, the Saxons settled the area, establishing the Kingdom of Sussex in 477, which lasted until  when the kingdom was annexed by Wessex.

The West Sussex County Council was established in 1889 within the ceremonial County of Sussex. After the reorganisation of local government in 1974, the ceremonial function of the historic county of Sussex was divided into two separate counties, West Sussex and East Sussex. The existing East and West Sussex councils took control respectively, with Mid Sussex and parts of Crawley being transferred to the West Sussex administration from East Sussex.

West Sussex has a range of scenery, including wealden, downland and coastal. The highest point of the county is Blackdown, at 280 metres (919 ft). It has a number of stately homes including Goodwood, Petworth House and Uppark, and castles such as Arundel Castle and Bramber Castle. Over half the county is protected countryside, offering walking, cycling and other recreational opportunities.

History

Although the name Sussex, derived from the Old English 'Sūþsēaxe' ('South Saxons'), dates from the Saxon period between AD 477 to 1066, the history of human habitation in Sussex goes back to the Old Stone Age. The oldest hominin remains known in Britain were found at Eartham Pit, Boxgrove. Sussex has been occupied since those times and has succumbed to various invasions and migrations throughout its long history.  Prehistoric monuments include the Devil's Jumps, a group of Bronze Age burial mounds, and the Iron Age Cissbury Ring and Chanctonbury Ring hill forts on the South Downs.

The Roman period saw the building of Fishbourne Roman Palace and rural villas such as Bignor Roman Villa together with a network of roads including Stane Street, the Chichester to Silchester Way and the Sussex Greensand Way. The Romans used the Weald for iron production on an industrial scale.

The foundation of the Kingdom of Sussex is recorded by the Anglo-Saxon Chronicle for the year AD 477; it says that Ælle arrived at a place called Cymenshore in three ships with his three sons and killed or put to flight the local inhabitants. The foundation story is regarded as somewhat of a myth by most historians, although the archaeology suggests that Saxons did start to settle in the area in the late 5th century. The Kingdom of Sussex was absorbed into Wessex as an earldom and became the county of Sussex.

With its origins in the kingdom of Sussex, the later county of Sussex was traditionally divided into six units known as rapes. By the 16th century, the three western rapes were grouped together informally, having their own separate Quarter Sessions. These were administered by a separate county council from 1888, the county of Sussex being divided for administrative purposes into the administrative counties of East and West Sussex.  In 1974, West Sussex was made a single ceremonial county with the coming into force of the Local Government Act 1972. At the same time a large part of the eastern rape of Lewes (the Mid Sussex district which includes the towns of Haywards Heath, Burgess Hill and East Grinstead) was transferred into West Sussex.

Provision for paupers
Until 1834 provision for the poor and destitute in West Sussex was made at parish level. From 1835 until 1948 eleven Poor Law Unions, each catering for several parishes, took on the job.

Settlements

Most settlements in West Sussex are either along the south coast or in Mid Sussex, near the M23/A23 corridor. The town of Crawley is the largest in the county with an estimated population of 106,600. The coastal settlement of Worthing closely follows with a population of 104,600. The seaside resort of Bognor Regis and the market town of Horsham are both large towns. Chichester, the county town, has a cathedral and city status, and is situated not far from the border with Hampshire. Other conurbations of a similar size are Burgess Hill, East Grinstead and Haywards Heath in the Mid Sussex district, Littlehampton in the Arun district, and Lancing, Southwick and Shoreham in the Adur district. Much of the coastal town population is part of the
Brighton/Worthing/Littlehampton conurbation.

Rustington and Southwater are the next largest settlements in the county. There are several more towns in West Sussex, although they are of similar size to other villages. The smaller towns of the county are Arundel, Midhurst, Petworth, Selsey, Steyning, Henfield, Pulborough and Storrington. The larger villages are Billingshurst, Copthorne, Crawley Down, Cuckfield, Hassocks, Hurstpierpoint and Lindfield. The current total population of the county makes up 1.53% of England's population.

Geography

Physical geography

West Sussex is bordered by Hampshire to the west, Surrey to the north and East Sussex to the east. The English Channel lies to the south. The area has been formed from Upper Jurassic and Lower Cretaceous rock strata, part of the Weald–Artois Anticline. The eastern part of this ridge, the Weald of Kent, Sussex and Surrey has been greatly eroded, with the chalk surface removed to expose older Lower Cretaceous rocks of the Wealden Group. In West Sussex the exposed rock becomes older towards the north of the county with Lower Greensand ridges along the border with Surrey including the highest point of the county at Blackdown. Erosion of softer sand and clay strata has hollowed out the basin of the Weald leaving a north facing scarp slope of the chalk which runs east and west across the whole county, broken only by the valleys of the River Arun and River Adur. In addition to these two rivers which drain most of the county a winterbourne, the River Lavant, flows intermittently from springs on the dip slope of the chalk downs north of Chichester.

The county makes up 1.52% of the total land of England, making it the 30th largest county in the country.

Climate
West Sussex is the sunniest county in the United Kingdom, according to Met Office records. Over the 29 years to 2011 it averaged 1902 hours of sunshine per year. Sunshine totals are highest near the coast with Bognor Regis often having the highest in mainland England, including a total of 2237 hours in 1990. Mean annual temperature for southern coastal counties is around 11 °C. The coldest month, January, has mean daily minimum temperatures of around 3 °C near the coast and lower inland. July tends to be the warmest month when mean daily maxima tend to be around 20 °C. A maximum temperature of 35.4 °C occurred at North Heath, Pulborough on 26 June 1976. Coastal high temperatures are often moderated by cooler sea breezes.

Monthly rainfall tends to be highest in autumn and early winter and lowest in the summer months, with July often being the driest month. There is less rainfall from summer convective showers and thunderstorms than in inland areas. The county can suffer both from localised flooding caused by heavy rainfall and from water shortages caused by prolonged periods of below average rainfall. Winter rainfall is needed to recharge the chalk aquifers from which much of the water supply is drawn.

Land economy
West Sussex developed distinctive land uses along with its neighbours in the weald. The Landrace cattle transformed into Sussex cattle and Sussex chickens emerged about the time of the Roman conquest. Some of the earliest evidence of horses in Britain has been found at Boxgrove, dated to 500,000 BC. Viticulture is a part of the economy, with wineries producing mainly sparkling wine of varied quality.

Communications and transport
The M23 Motorway runs from London to the south of Crawley. The A23 and A24 roads run from London to Brighton and Worthing respectively with the A29 a little further west ending in Bognor Regis. Other major roads are the A272 which runs east to west through the middle of the county and the A27 which does the same but closer to the coast. The A259 is a local alternate route to the A27 in the eastern coastal strip.

Gatwick Airport, which handled over 33 million passengers and had over 250,000 aircraft movements in 2011, is located within the borders of Crawley, and is the second largest airport in the United Kingdom. There is also a considerably smaller local airport at Shoreham and a grass airfield handling light aircraft and helicopters at Goodwood. There are three main railway routes: the Brighton Main Line, the Arun Valley Line and the West Coastway Line. The Portsmouth Direct Line serves and occasionally enters the westernmost part of West Sussex, although it has no railway stations in the county.

Politics

Members of Parliament 
Since the 2015 general election, West Sussex has been represented entirely by Conservative Members of Parliament (MPs).

County Council

West Sussex County Council (WSCC) is the authority that governs the non-metropolitan county of West Sussex. The county contains 7 district and borough councils (Adur, Arun, Chichester, Crawley, Horsham, Mid Sussex and Worthing), and 159 town, parish and neighbourhood councils.

West Sussex County Council has 71 councillors; the majority of them being Conservative. There are 46 Conservative councillors, 10 UK Independence Party, 8 Liberal Democrats, 6 Labour Party councillors and 1 Independent councillor.  The Chief Executive and his team of executive directors are responsible for the day-to-day running of the council.

West Sussex County Council is based at County Hall, Chichester and provides a large range of services including education, social services, fire and rescue, libraries, trading standards, town and country planning, refuse disposal and consumer services.

West Sussex Youth Cabinet
The West Sussex Youth Cabinet is a group of local representatives and four UK Youth Parliament (UKYP) representatives, who are elected by young people in West Sussex. The Youth Cabinet represents the views of the young people West Sussex at county level. Elections for the Youth Cabinet and UKYP in West Sussex run every year in March.

Places of interest

Nature and zoos

 Chichester Harbour
 Pagham Harbour – A protected area of wetland that is an important feeding ground for birds.
 RSPB Pulborough Brooks
 Selsey Bill
 South Downs Way – a long distance footpath
 Stansted Park
 St Leonard's Forest
 Tilgate Park
 Wakehurst Place
 Warnham Local Nature Reserve, a 92-acre site with visitor centre
 WWT Arundel (a nature reserve of the Wildfowl and Wetlands Trust)

Castles, houses and other buildings
 Arundel Castle
 Barnham Windmill
 Bramber Castle
 Christ's Hospital, an old charitable school notable for its archaic uniforms and picturesque campus.
 Goodwood House and Goodwood Motor Circuit
 High Salvington windmill
 Hurstpierpoint College, a public school, notable for its substantial Sussex flint buildings and large campus.
 Lancing College, a public school, notable for its substantial Sussex sandstone chapel and large campus.
 Seaford College, a public school known for its large campus
 Nymans house and gardens, a National Trust property near Handcross, Haywards Heath
 Petworth House and deer park.
 Queen Victoria Hospital, East Grinstead, where Sir Archibald McIndoe carried out reconstructive surgery for burns patients during the Second World War.
 Sackville College, a Jacobean almshouse in East Grinstead
 Shipley Windmill, (no longer open to the public).
 Standen, East Grinstead
 Uppark, a 17th-century mansion high on the South Downs.

Religious buildings

The Cathedral Church of the Holy Trinity, otherwise called Chichester Cathedral, is the seat of the Anglican Bishop of Chichester. It was founded as a cathedral in 1075, when the seat of the bishop was moved from Selsey Abbey. The cathedral has architecture in both the Norman and the Gothic styles, and has been called by the architectural historian Nikolaus Pevsner "the most typical English Cathedral". The Cathedral Church of Our Lady and St Philip Howard in Arundel is the Roman Catholic cathedral of the Diocese of Arundel and Brighton. Built in French Gothic style and dedicated in 1873 as the Catholic parish church of Arundel, it was not designated a cathedral until the foundation of the diocese in 1965.

Bosham Church is partly of Saxon construction and is shown on the Bayeux Tapestry as the local church of late Saxon and Danish kings of England. Many other Saxon and early Norman have survived in the county with little alteration including the Church of St Mary the Blessed Virgin, Sompting, an 11th-century Anglo-Saxon church with a Rhenish helm unique in England and St. Nicholas Church, Worth, a 10th-century church in Worth, Crawley. Some Anglican churches and many of the numerous nonconformist chapels in the county have been converted to residential use. Cittaviveka is a Buddhist monastery in Chithurst.

Museums
Worthing Museum & Art Gallery
Amberley Museum & Heritage Centre
  Manor Cottage
  Steyning Museum
 Tangmere Military Aviation Museum
 Horsham Museum
 Weald and Downland Open Air Museum of historic buildings at Singleton
 Wings Museum, Balcombe

Arts
Pallant House Gallery in Chichester houses one of the most significant collections of 20th-century British art outside London. It includes a substantial body of early and mid-20th-century work bequeathed by Walter Hussey and many later works donated by Sir Colin St John 'Sandy' Wilson.

Worthing Museum and Art Gallery houses a large collection of Georgian and Victorian costume. The Cass Sculpture Foundation has an outdoor sculpture park at Goodwood.

Television
BBC South covers the county excluding Haywards Heath, Burgess Hill, East Grinstead and Shoreham-by-Sea which are covered by BBC South East. ITV Meridian also covers the county. Crawley is covered by both regions and by BBC London and ITV London.

Economy and demography
This is a table of trend of regional gross value added of West Sussex at current basic prices published by Office for National Statistics with figures in millions of British Pounds Sterling.

Significant companies in the county include Rolls-Royce Motor Cars, a substantial employer near Chichester. Gatwick Airport, with associated airlines including British Airways and Virgin Atlantic, is a major source of direct and indirect employment. Thales Group also has a presence in the county. Nestlé has their UK headquarters in Crawley.

The table below shows the population change up to the 2011 census, contrasting the previous census.  It also shows the proportion of residents in each district reliant upon lowest income and/or joblessness benefits, the national average proportion of which was 4.5% as at August 2012, the year for which latest datasets have been published.  It can be seen that the most populous district of West Sussex is Arun containing the towns of Arundel, Bognor Regis and Littlehampton:

Education

West Sussex has a comprehensive education system, with a mix of county-maintained secondary schools and academies and over twenty independent senior schools. In addition primary education is provided through a mix of around 240 infant, junior, primary, first and middle schools.

Colleges include The College of Richard Collyer, Central Sussex College, Northbrook College and The Weald School.

Independent schools in the county include Christ's Hospital near Horsham, whose students wear Tudor style uniform, Seaford College, Lancing College and Hurstpierpoint College.

Tertiary education is provided by the University of Chichester and Chichester College.

Sport
At least 40 sports are active in West Sussex. Sussex was the first First-Class cricket county formed in 1839 and was a cradle for club cricket. Sussex is home to Fontwell Park Racecourse. The county has one Football League club located in Crawley, that is Crawley Town F.C.

See also

 List of Lord Lieutenants of West Sussex
 List of High Sheriffs of West Sussex
 List of hills of West Sussex
 The Royal Sussex Regiment
 Healthcare in Sussex

References

External links
 West Sussex County Council
 Images of West Sussex at the English Heritage Archive
Further historical information and sources on GENUKI

 
Non-metropolitan counties
South East England
Coast to Capital Local Enterprise Partnership
Counties of England established in 1974